Alien vs. Predator: Original Motion Picture Soundtrack is the official soundtrack album of the 2004 science fiction film Alien vs. Predator. Composed by Austrian Harald Kloser, Kloser was chosen by the film's director Paul W. S. Anderson, as he was an enthusiastic fan of the series. The score is completely orchestral and was released on August 9, 2004 on iTunes and on August 31, 2004 on Audio CD and Compact Cassette by Varèse Sarabande and Fox Music.

Reviews
The soundtrack received mixed reviews from critics. Mike Brennan thought it "lacks the ingenuity of the previous trilogy (Alien) and the Predator scores, which all shared a strong sense of rhythm in place of thematic content. Kloser throws in some interesting percussion cues ("Antarctica" and "Down the Tunnel"), but more as a sound effect than a consistent motif." John Fallon of JoBlo.com compared it to character development in the movie, "too generic to completely engage or leave a permanent impression." James Christopher Monger of Allmusic awarded the album 3.5 out of 5, and thought Kloser introduced electronic elements well, and called "Alien vs. Predator Main Theme" a, "particularly striking and serves as a continuous creative source for the composer to dip his baton in".

Track listing

Selected credits
Conductor [Score], Orchestrated By [Score] – James Brett 
Edited By [Assistant Music Editor] – Matt Robertson
Edited By [Supervising Music Editor] – Andy Glen 
Executive Producer – Robert Townson 
Mastered By [Mastering Engineer] – Patricia Sullivan Fourstar 
Music By – Harald Kloser 
Music By [Additional] – James Brett, Thomas Schobel, Thomas Wanker 
Orchestrated By [Additional] – Marcus Trump, Matt Dunkley 
Programmed By [Sequence Programming By] – Matt Robertson, Thomas Schobel, Thomas Wanker 
Recorded By [Score], Mixed By [Score] – Geoff Foster 
Supervised By [Music Supervised For Twentieth Century Fox By] – Michael Knobloch

Notes

References

2004 soundtrack albums
Varèse Sarabande soundtracks
Alien (franchise) soundtracks
Predator (franchise)
Alien vs. Predator (franchise) mass media
Science fiction film soundtracks
Action film soundtracks